Greatest Hits is a greatest hits album by the English girl group Spice Girls. It received a physical release worldwide throughout November 2007, except for the United States where it received a limited release on 6 November 2007 through Victoria's Secret and a full release on 15 January 2008. It was their first album to be released in seven years and was supported by an accompanying world tour. The album sold 1.7 million copies by the end of 2007 and was the world's best selling girl group album of that year.
In August 2012, after the Spice Girls' performance at the 2012 Summer Olympics in London, the album re-charted in the top ten, twenty and thirty of most major charts worldwide including the United Kingdom, United States, New Zealand and Australia.

The album's only single, "Headlines (Friendship Never Ends)", was released on radio on 23 October, whilst released digitally on 5 November and commercially on 19 November 2007. It was also announced as the official Children in Need charity single for 2007. The single managed to go to number three on the UK Physical Singles Chart.

Background

The plan to reform and release a greatest hits had long been speculated by the media, but its planned release was first confirmed by Melanie Brown in June 2005. She stated, "We'll get back together because we all want to. I know everyone is up for it. There is going to be a greatest hits album and we've got loads of new songs that nobody has heard yet." In 2007, rumours aroused again about the group's reunion. Melanie C commented about the rumours, saying "For the first time ever, there is some truth in the rumours…it could happen", but it would just be for "a very short space of time…a final goodbye", and a thank you to the fans. She also added that when it came to decide whether they would regroup or not, the singer was the last to make her decision, as she was "scared we couldn't do it again. It was a weird time of my life, I had a lot of personal s**t to get over after the Spice Girls".

On 28 June 2007, the group held a press conference at The O2 Arena to finally reveal their intention to reunite. During the conference, the group confirmed their intention to embark upon a worldwide concert tour, starting in Vancouver on 2 December 2007. The tour would cover six continents within 11 dates. "I want to be a Spice Girl again. We are like sisters and we have our arguments, but by the end of the day we get back together", said Emma Bunton, whilst Melanie C commented that the tour "will be a proper good farewell to our fans". Victoria Beckham also elaborated that "My main reason for doing this is for my kids - so they can see what mummy used to do. I'm going to be the cool one in the family for once!". They reportedly received £10 million each for the reunion.

Release
The album was released in several different formats, including versions with bonus DVDs and CDs. The limited edition box set includes the normal standard edition CD, a karaoke CD, a remix CD, a DVD of the group's music videos, individual postcards of each Spice Girl and a friendship bracelet bearing the words Spice Girls. In the United States, the album was initially released only through Victoria's Secret stores, including three downloadable remixes of "Wannabe", "2 Become 1" and "Spice Up Your Life", Simon Fuller, the group's manager, said, "I am delighted to be working with Victoria's Secret on the Greatest Hits album and welcome their innovative approach to marketing". The album was released digitally via the iTunes Store on the same day. The album was released nationwide on 15 January 2008. Despite the revision of the Billboard charts in the United States, defining that albums sold by exclusive retailers were eligible to chart on the Billboard 200, Greatest Hits sold over 600,000 copies through Victoria's Secret stores, but was not eligible to chart in the week of 13 November 2007 due to Victoria's Secret not being SoundScan enabled.

Artwork
The artwork for Greatest Hits was revealed through the group's official website in August 2007. According to the announcement, the group were all involved with the design, and were pleased with the outcome. It features a jewel encrusted logo, which pays homage to their debut album, Spice (1996). The jewels were designed by David Morris and each letter represents one member of the group. The "S" is made from amber and represents Victoria Beckham; the ruby pink "P" is Emma Bunton; Melanie C's letter "I" is made from a diamond; Geri Halliwell is the "C", made from amethyst stones and the emerald "E" is Melanie B. According to a source, they wanted something simple and stylish.

Promotion

In November 2007, the group performed together for the first time in nearly a decade at the 2007 Victoria's Secret Fashion Show, held in Los Angeles, California. The group dressed in military-themed outfits performed "Stop" and "Headlines (Friendship Never Ends)" miming to a backing track, in front of giant glittering lights that spelled out "Spice" in the background. A taped performance of the group lyp-synching the songs, while dressed in blue sailor outfits, aired on 17 November 2007 for the Children in Need 2007 telethon. The song was also the official Children in Need single of 2007. In addition, they performed "2 Become 1" on the finale of the fifth season of the British television show Strictly Come Dancing. Filmmaker Bob Smeaton, directed an official documentary on the reunion. It was entitled Spice Girls: Giving You Everything and was first aired on Australia's Fox8 on 16 December 2007, followed by BBC One in the United Kingdom, on 31 December.

On 28 June 2007, the group held a press conference at The O2 Arena revealing their intention to reunite and embark upon a tour. They announced The Return of the Spice Girls tour on their website, and it would start in Vancouver on 2 December 2007. Ticket sales for the first London date of the tour sold out in 38 seconds. It was reported that over one million people signed up in the UK alone and over five million worldwide for the ticket ballot on the band's official website. Sixteen additional dates in London had been added and sold out. In the United States, Las Vegas, Los Angeles and San Jose shows also sold out, prompting additional dates to be added. It was announced that the Spice Girls would be playing dates in Chicago, Detroit and Boston, as well as additional dates in New York to keep up with the demand. On the first concert in Canada, they performed to an audience of 15,000 people, singing twenty songs and changing a total of eight times. On 1 February 2008, it was announced that due to personal and family commitments their tour would come to an end in Toronto on 26 February 2008, meaning that tour dates in Beijing, Hong Kong, Shanghai, Sydney, Cape Town and Buenos Aires were cancelled.

Single
The album's only new single, "Headlines (Friendship Never Ends)", was released on radio on 23 October, whilst released digitally on 5 November and commercially on 19 November 2007. It was also announced as the official Children in Need charity single for 2007. Spice Girls member Geri Halliwell described the song as a "big love song" and "a Spice Girl classic". "Headlines (Friendship Never Ends)" peaked at number 11 in the United Kingdom. However, the single managed to go to number three on the UK Physical Singles Chart.

Reception

Critical response

Stephen Thomas Erlewine of AllMusic wrote that the songs featured on the album "have aged exactly as you thought they might". Spence D. of IGN cited Greatest Hits as being "pretty much what you would expect it to be". According to a writer from The Daily Collegian, the greatest hits compilation "shows us that when these five women sing, they sound awesome", whilst also commenting that its members "have changed in their time away from each other, but the distinctive sound of the Spice Girls remains the same as it always was". Talia Kraines, writing for BBC Music was positive in her review, saying that "if you were one of the many haters of the Spice Girls back in the day, then this CD isn't going to change your mind about them. But if you grew up watching their every move, then this is a slice of nostalgia that miraculously still sounds fresh today". Nick Levine of Digital Spy website noted that "none of the group's three albums was devoid of filler, and their singles tended to be their very best songs, so Greatest Hits is a very welcome addition to the band's canon".

NME gave the compilation a mixed review, stating that "about halfway through this comp it hits home how dramatically the Spice Girls lost the plot", whilst commenting that songs like "Say You'll Be There" and "Goodbye" were "fine songs in any age". San Francisco Chronicles Aidin Vaziri commented: "After an exuberant run out of the gate with delicious pop fodder such as "Wannabe" and "Say You'll Be There," things go horribly wrong midway through the set. All of a sudden, Ginger goes missing, self-awareness kicks in and the girls start playing catch-up with Destiny's Child, using songs that sound like that band's castoffs". San Antonio Current criticized their solo vocals and called them the reason why they did not have successful solo careers, and commented that it was "no surprise, then, that the Spices sound best in the anonymous disco surroundings" of "Who Do You Think You Are", "Stop", and "Spice Up Your Life". Criag Mathieson from The Age newspaper said "With their failed third album, Forever, getting cursory coverage, it's all about their first two discs", whilst adding that "their debut single Wannabe remains a zesty proposition", and "the plethora of sleeve photos allow you to compare before-and-after plastic surgery looks". Darcie Stevens of The Austin Chronicle gave the album one out of five stars and said "Fifteen songs of girl power, in case you didn't get enough the first time around".

Commercial performance
In the group's home country of the United Kingdom, the album missed the top spot, peaking at number two on the UK Albums Chart, beaten by Leona Lewis' Spirit by 300,000 copies. To date, it has sold in excess of 400,000 in the country. Despite missing number one in the United Kingdom, it managed to become the group's first number-one album in Australia, and was certified platinum there (for shipments of over 70,000 units).

For reasons stated above, despite selling over 600,000 copies through Victoria's Secret stores in the United States, the album barely made the top 100 of the Billboard 200, peaking at number 93. Elsewhere, the album peaked at number 3 in Ireland, number 15 in New Zealand, and managed to peak inside the top 20 in Italy, the top 50 in Sweden and Germany, and the top 75 in Switzerland, Austria, and the Netherlands. The album made the top 10 at number 7 on the European Top 100 Albums chart, published by Billboard. In August 2012, after the Spice Girls' performance at the 2012 Summer Olympics in London, the album re-charted in the top ten, twenty and thirty of most major charts worldwide including the United Kingdom, United States, New Zealand and Australia.

In June 2019, the Greatest Hits album was certified Double platinum for sales of 600,000 in the UK. In August 2020, the album was certified Gold by IFPI Denmark for sales of 10,000.

Track listing

Notes
 signifies an additional producer

Charts

Weekly charts

Year-end charts

Certifications and sales

Release history

References

Spice Girls albums
2007 greatest hits albums
Virgin Records compilation albums
Albums produced by Richard Stannard (songwriter)